Dalmacio de Mur y de Cervelló (died 12 September 1456)  was a Spanish prelate of the fifteenth century. He served as Bishop of Girona (1415–1418),  Bishop of Tarragona (1419–1431), and finally  Archbishop of Zaragoza (1431–1456).

Dalmacio de Mur y Cervelló was born at Cervera. He was a patron of the arts, embellishing with  Gothic art the churches he served in. In 1426 he commissioned from the sculptor Pere Johan (active 1418–1458) the alabaster and wood retablo that still dominates the Cathedral of Tarragona. He was buried in the La Seo Cathedral of Zaragoza.

Sources 
"The Retable of Don Dalmau de Mur y Cervelló from the Archbishop's Palace at Saragossa: A Documented Work" by Francí Gomar and Tomás Giner, R. Steven Janke, Metropolitan Museum Journal, Vol. 18. (1983), pp. 65–83.

See also 
Archdiocese of Tarragona
Archdiocese of Zaragoza

External links 
Coat of arms of Dalmacio de Mur y de Cervelló

1456 deaths
Archbishops of Zaragoza
Archbishops of Tarragona
15th-century Roman Catholic archbishops in the Kingdom of Aragon
Year of birth unknown